Peter Cuddon (fl. 1372–1390), of Dunwich, Suffolk, was an English politician.

Family
His sons were Peter Cuddon and Robert Cuddon, both MPs for Dunwich.

Career
He was a Member (MP) of the Parliament of England for Dunwich in 1372, 1373, February 1383, April 1384, 1386, September 1388 and January 1390.

References

Year of birth missing
Year of death missing
English MPs 1372
People from Dunwich
English MPs 1373
English MPs February 1383
English MPs 1386
English MPs September 1388
English MPs January 1390